Poggio Catino is a  (municipality) in the Province of Rieti in the Italian region of Latium, located about  northeast of Rome and about  southwest of Rieti.

History
The village was created at the end of the 11th century, above the Moricone hill, to find a larger building space than that of the nearby village of Catino, founded in the 7th century, and nowadays a hamlet of it. The toponym itself describes the topography of the built-up area: a hillock (poggio) above a basin (catino). Anciently under the rule of Farfa Abbey, it became part of the Province of Perugia, after the Italian unification (1861). Since 1927, with the creation of the Province of Rieti, Poggio Catino, as well as the rest of the new province, passed from the region of Umbria to the one of Lazio.

Geography
Poggio Catino is a hilltown part of the historic region of Sabina. The municipality borders with Cantalupo in Sabina, Forano, Poggio Mirteto, Roccantica and Salisano.

Its only hamlet (frazione), is the nearby village of Catino, 1 km far and with a population of 112.

Demographics

Gallery

Personalities
Gregory of Catino (1060–1130), Christian monk and historian

References

External links

 Poggio Catino official website
 Poggio Catino page on Sabina website

Cities and towns in Lazio